The Optimum "L" filter (also known as a Legendre–Papoulis filter) was proposed by Athanasios Papoulis in 1958. It has the maximum roll off rate for a given filter order while maintaining a monotonic frequency response. It provides a compromise between the Butterworth filter which is monotonic but has a slower roll off and the Chebyshev filter which has a faster roll off but has ripple in either the passband or stopband. The filter design is based on Legendre polynomials which is the reason for its alternate name and the "L" in Optimum "L".

See also
 Bessel filter
 Elliptic filter

References
 
  Second Edition.
 Optimum “L” Filters: Polynomials, Poles and Circuit Elements by C. Bond, 2004
 Notes on “L” (Optimal) Filters by C. Bond, 2011

Linear filters
Network synthesis filters
Electronic design